is a Japanese voice actor who works for Office Osawa. He is best known for Japanese dubbing role for Ryan Reynolds and Paul Bettany.

Filmography

Television animation
2002
Secret of Cerulean Sand (Kera Colorage)
2003
Battle Vixens (Genka Kada)
Bobobo-bo Bo-bobo (Megafan)
Naruto (Kankuro)
2004
Destiny of the Shrine Maiden (Girochi)
Diamond Daydreams (Jurota Tokibi)
Mermaid Melody Pichi Pichi Pitch (Kashiwagi)
Mezzo DSA (Leon)
2005
Absolute Boy (Takuma Kaburaki)
Kyo Kara Maoh! (Christel)
2006
Air Gear (Fumei Goshogawara)
2007
Darker Than Black (Louis)
Naruto: Shippuden (Kankuro)
Bleach (Ashido Kano)
Neuro: Supernatural Detective (Tōko Eishiya, Yasuji Meguri)
2008
Inazuma Eleven series (Ryugo Someoka, Kazumichi Banjō, Dante Diablo, Takanori Kujirai, Mack Scride, Reo Goryū, Ganjirō Seki)
Hell Girl: Three Vessels (Seiji Yamaoka)
Rosario + Vampire series (Okuto Kotsubo)
Soul Eater (Eibon)
Strike Witches (Kurt Flachfeld)
Yozakura Quartet series (Shidō Mizuki)
Sands of Destruction (Jade)
One Outs (Jack, Yamakawa, Kinouchi, Sawamura)
2009
Fullmetal Alchemist: Brotherhood (Henry Douglas)
Tamagotchi! (Spacytchi)
2010
Fairy Tail (Simon, Dan Straight)
Rainbow: Nisha Rokubō no Shichinin (Yokoyama)
2012
Sankarea: Undying Love (Danichiro Sanka (young))
2015
Durarara!!x2 (Mikiya Awakusu)
Subete ga F ni Naru (Sōhei Saikawa)
2016
Descending Stories: Showa Genroku Rakugo Shinju (Yakuza Boss)
91 Days (Serpente)
JoJo's Bizarre Adventure: Diamond Is Unbreakable (Mikitaka Hazekura)
2017
 Chain Chronicle ~Light of Haecceitas~ (Silva)
 Attack on Titan (Gelgar)
2018
 One Piece (Morgans)
 Boruto: Naruto Next Generations (Kankuro)
2020
 Pet (Hayashi)
2021
 The Promised Neverland Season 2 (William Minerva)
2022
 Golden Kamuy 4th Season (Waichirō Sekiya)
 Cyberpunk: Edgerunners (Falco)
 To Your Eternity (season 2) (Kai Renald Rawle)
2023
 Masamune-kun's Revenge R (Frank Besson)

Unknown date
Cardfight!! Vanguard: Link Joker Hen (Eru Nakagami)
Code Geass (Kewell Soresi, Yoshitaka Minami, Claudio S. Darlton)
Code Geass R2 (Yoshitaka Minami, Claudio S. Darlton)
D.Gray-Man (Lenny)
Gungrave (Jolice)
Gunparade March (Junichi Tajima)
Initial D: Fifth Stage (Eiji Kubo)
Iron Man (Cancer)
Marvel Disk Wars: The Avengers (Thor Odinson/Thor, JARVIS)
Mobile Suit Gundam 00 (Emilio Ribisi)
Rocket Girls (Norman Randolph)
Shigurui (Masazumi Honda)
Squid Girl (Narrator)
Tokyo Majin (Kureha Mibu)
Transformers: Cybertron (Tera Shaver, Red Alert)
Trouble Chocolate (Truffle)
Uninhabited Planet Survive! (Farlow)
Zatch Bell! (Maestro)

Original video animation
Street Fighter Alpha: Generations (2005) (Ryu)
Iron Man: Rise of Technovore (2013) (JARVIS)
Thus Spoke Kishibe Rohan (2018) (Mikitaka Hazekura)
Fullmetal Alchemist: Brotherhood (????) (Heathcliff Arb)
Halo Legends (????) (Ralph)
Yozakura Quartet ~Tsuki ni Naku~ (????) (Shidō Mizuki)

Original net animation
Hero Mask (2018–19) (James Blood)
Cyberpunk: Edgerunners (2022) (Falco)

Theatrical animation
Appleseed: Ex Machina (2007) (Yoshitsune Miyamoto)
Ghost in the Shell: The New Movie (2015) (Administrator of Protective Institution)
Inazuma Eleven GO vs. Danbōru Senki W (2012) (Ryugo Someoka)
Inazuma Eleven: Saikyō Gundan Ōga Shūrai (2010) (Ryugo Someoka)
Legend of the Millennium Dragon (2011) (Sadaharu Usui)
Naruto the Movie: Legend of the Stone of Gelel (2005) (Kankuro)
Naruto Shippuden the Movie: The Will of Fire (2009) (Kankuro)
Tales of Vesperia: The First Strike (2009) (Yurgis)

Video games
Way of the Samurai(2002) (Kenji)
Super Robot Wars Alpha 3 (2005) (Touma Kanou)
Final Fantasy XII (2006) (Prince Rasler Heios Nabradia)
Final Fantasy XIII (2009) (Rygdea)
JoJo's Bizarre Adventure: All Star Battle (2013) (Funny Valentine)
Granblue Fantasy (2014) (Edgedweller)
Initial D Arcade Stage (2002—2014) (Eiji Kubo)
Bravely Second (2015) (Jean Engarde)
JoJo's Bizarre Adventure: Eyes of Heaven (2015) (Funny Valentine)
Xenoblade Chronicles 2 (2017) (Poppibuster/Hanabuster)
Xenoblade Chronicles 2: Torna – The Golden Country (2018) (Zettar)
Fate/Grand Order (2018) (Sakamoto Ryōma)
Granblue Fantasy (2019) (Joy)
Nioh 2 (2020) (Saika Magoichi)
Final Fantasy VII Remake (2020) (Johnny)
Tales of Arise (2021) (Dohalim)
Fortnite (2021) (Guy)(Japanese server)

Drama CD
Final Fantasy Tactics Advance (????) (Cid Randell)

Dubbing

Live-action
Paul Bettany
The Da Vinci Code (Silas)
Iron Man (JARVIS)
Iron Man 2 (JARVIS)
The Tourist (Insp. John Acheson)
Priest (Priest)
The Avengers (JARVIS)
Iron Man 3 (JARVIS)
Avengers: Age of Ultron (JARVIS, Vision)
Captain America: Civil War (Vision)
Avengers: Infinity War (Vision)
WandaVision (Vision)
Ryan Reynolds
X-Men Origins: Wolverine (Wade Wilson)
Safe House (2018 BS Japan edition) (Matt Weston)
Deadpool (Wade Wilson/Deadpool)
Life (Rory Adams)
Deadpool 2 (Wade Wilson/Deadpool)
Hobbs & Shaw (Locke)
6 Underground (One)
Free Guy (Guy)
Red Notice (Nolan Booth)
Hitman's Wife's Bodyguard (Michael Bryce)
The Adam Project (Older Adam Reed)
Chris Evans
London (Syd)
The Nanny Diaries (Hayden "Harvard Hottie")
Push (Nick Grant)
What's Your Number? (Colin Shea)
Gifted (Frank Adler)
Defending Jacob (Andy Barber)
Josh Stewart
Dirt (Holt McLaren)
Criminal Minds (William LaMontagne Jr.)
The Death and Life of Bobby Z (Monk)
The Dark Knight Rises (Barsad)
Grimm (Bill)
Leonardo DiCaprio
Shutter Island (Edward "Teddy" Daniels)
Django Unchained ("Monsieur" Calvin J. Candie)
The Wolf of Wall Street (Jordan Belfort)
The Revenant (Hugh Glass)
Once Upon a Time in Hollywood (Rick Dalton)
James Franco
Milk (Scott Smith)
Eat Pray Love (David)
127 Hours (Aron Ralston)
Future World (Warlord)
Zeroville (Vikar)
Ben Foster
Alpha Dog (Jake Mazursky)
Pandorum (Corporal Bower)
Lone Survivor (Matthew "Axe" Axelson)
Galveston (Roy)
The Contractor (Mike Hawkins)
Ryan Gosling
Half Nelson (Dan Dunne)
Gangster Squad (Sergeant Jerry Wooters)
Blade Runner 2049 (Officer "Joe" K)
Jeremy Renner
The Hurt Locker (Sergeant First Class William James)
The Immigrant (Orlando the Magician/Emil)
Arrival (Ian Donnelly)
24 (Keith Palmer (Vicellous Reon Shannon), Cole Ortiz (Freddie Prinze Jr.))
300 (Astinos (Tom Wisdom))
The 4400 (Kyle Baldwin (Chad Faust))
8 Mile (James "B-Rabbit" Smith, Jr. (Eminem))
90210 (Liam Court (Matt Lanter))
All Quiet on the Western Front (Paul Bäumer (Lew Ayres))
All the King's Men (Jack Burden (Jude Law))
The Americans (Philip Jennings (Matthew Rhys))
Arena (David Lord (Kellan Lutz))
Armored (Officer Jake Eckehart (Milo Ventimiglia))
As Above, So Below (Papillon (François Civil))
Auto Focus (Richard Dawson (Michael E. Rodgers))
Back to the Future (2014 BS Japan edition) (George McFly (Crispin Glover))
Basic (Jay Pike (Taye Diggs))
Beverly Hills Chihuahua 2 (Sam Cortez (Marcus Coloma))
Big Little Lies (Ed Mackenzie (Adam Scott))
Black Adam (Ishmael Gregor / Sabbac (Marwan Kenzari))
Black Hawk Down (SFC Kurt "Doc" Schmid (Hugh Dancy))
Bones (Jared Booth (Brendan Fehr))
Bottoms Up (Owen Peadman (Jason Mewes))
Bully (Derek Kaufman (Leo Fitzpatrick))
Carlito's Way: Rise to Power (Carlito "Charlie" Brigante (Jay Hernandez))
Centurion (Quintus Dias (Michael Fassbender))
Chasing Liberty (Ben Calder (Matthew Goode))
The City of Your Final Destination (Omar Razaghi (Omar Metwally))
The Connection (Le Fou (Benoît Magimel))
The Day After Tomorrow (Parker (Sasha Roiz))
Dear John (Randy Welch (Scott Porter))
The Detonator (Dimitru Ilinca (Matthew Leitch))
The Devil Wears Prada (2010 NTV edition) (Nate Cooper (Adrian Grenier))
Dexter (Joey Quinn (Desmond Harrington))
The Diabolical (Nikolai (Arjun Gupta))
Diary of the Dead (Jason Creed (Joshua Close))
The Dreamers (Théo (Louis Garrel))
Drugstore Cowboy (David (Max Perlich))
Emma (George Knightley (Johnny Flynn))
Everybody's Fine (Robert Goode (Sam Rockwell))
The Evil Dead (Scotty (Hal Delrich))
The Fall (Roy Walker/Black Bandit (Lee Pace))
Final Destination 3 (Jason Wise (Jesse Moss), Sean (Dylan Basile))
The Fortress (Seo Nal-soi (Go Soo))
The Four Feathers (Tom Willoughby (Rupert Penry-Jones))
Freddy vs. Jason (Bill Freeburg (Kyle Labine))
The Front Line (First Lieutenant Kim Soo-hyeok (Go Soo))
Game of Thrones (Daario Naharis (Michiel Huisman))
Garden State (Andrew Largeman (Zach Braff))
Gossip Girl (Damien Daalgard (Kevin Zegers))
Gotham (Hugo Strange (BD Wong))
The Great Gatsby (Nick Carraway (Tobey Maguire))
The Green Inferno (Alejandro (Ariel Levy))
Grey's Anatomy (George O'Malley (T. R. Knight))
He Got Game (Sip (Travis Best))
The Help (Johnny Foote (Mike Vogel))
The Hitcher (Jim Hasley (Zachary Knighton))
Hostage (Dennis Kelly (Jonathan Tucker))
Hot Tub Time Machine (Blaine (Sebastian Stan))
Hugo (Mr. Cabret (Jude Law))
I Am Number Four (John Smith/Number Four/Daniel Jones (Alex Pettyfer))
I Come with the Rain (Meng Zi (Shawn Yue))
I Feel Pretty (Grant LeClaire (Tom Hopper))
I'll Always Know What You Did Last Summer (Colby Patterson (David Paetkau))
iCarly (T-Bo (BooG!e))
Immortals (Stavros (Stephen Dorff))
The Incredible Hulk Returns (Donald Blake (Steve Levitt))
Infernal Affairs II (Chan Wing-yan (Shawn Yue))
Interstellar (Tom Cooper (Casey Affleck))
Invictus (Francois Pienaar (Matt Damon))
The King (Elvis Valderez (Gael García Bernal))
L.A.'s Finest (Ben Walker (Zach Gilford))
The Last Airbender (Commander Zhao (Aasif Mandvi))
The Last House on the Left (Francis (Aaron Paul))
The Last Princess (Yi Wu (Ko Soo))
Locke (Ivan Locke (Tom Hardy))
The Lord of the Rings: The Rings of Power (Gil-galad (Benjamin Walker))
Lovelace (Chuck Traynor (Peter Sarsgaard))
Lupin III (Michael Lee (Jerry Yan))
Medium (Sam Elkin (Edoardo Ballerini))
Men in Black (1st Lieutenant Jake Jensen (Kent Faulcon))
The Mermaid (Octopus (Show Lo))
Midway (Richard Best (Ed Skrein))
Miracles from Heaven (Dr. Kevin Beam (Martin Henderson))
Missing (Consul Phil Putnam (David Clennon))
Mo' Better Blues (Left Hand Lacey (Giancarlo Esposito))
Monte Carlo (Riley (Luke Bracey))
Motherless Brooklyn (Lionel Essrog (Edward Norton))
The Mummy: Tomb of the Dragon Emperor (Alex O'Connell (Luke Ford))
NCIS: New Orleans (Christopher LaSalle (Lucas Black))
Need for Speed (Tobey Marshall (Aaron Paul))
New Year's Eve (Randy (Ashton Kutcher))
No Country for Old Men (Deputy Wendell (Garret Dillahunt))
Numb3rs (Colby Granger (Dylan Bruno))
The O.C. (D.J. (Nicholas Gonzalez))
Outcast (Kyle Barnes (Patrick Fugit))
Oz (Miguel Alvarez (Kirk Acevedo))
The Pillars of the Earth (Jack Jackson (Eddie Redmayne))
Pirates of the Caribbean: On Stranger Tides (Scrum (Stephen Graham))
Populaire (Bob Taylor (Shaun Benson))
Primeval (Stephen Hart (James Murray))
Pulse (Josh Ockmann (Jonathan Tucker))
The Recruit (Alan (Kenneth Mitchell))
The Ridiculous 6 (Will Patch (Will Forte))
Rogue One: A Star Wars Story (Cassian Andor (Diego Luna))
The Rookie (Joel De La Garza (Angelo Spizzirri))
Rules of Engagement (Hayes Lawrence Hodges III (Nicky Katt))
Sense8 (Lito Rodriguez (Miguel Ángel Silvestre))
She's the Man (Duke Orsino (Channing Tatum))
The Shepherd: Border Patrol (Benjamin Meyers (Stephen Lord))
Shooter (Bob Lee Swagger (Ryan Phillippe))
Shooters (Justin "J" (Andrew Howard))
Shopgirl (Jeremy (Jason Schwartzman))
Sky High (Lash (Jake Sandvig))
Smallville (Oliver Queen/Green Arrow (Justin Hartley))
Smokey and the Bandit II (Little Enos Burdette (Paul Williams))
Smokey and the Bandit Part 3 (Little Enos Burdette (Paul Williams))
The Social Network (Divya Narendra (Max Minghella))
Stalingrad (Sgt. Chavanov (Dmitriy Lysenkov))
Stand by Me (Ace Merill (Kiefer Sutherland))
Star Wars (Lieutenant Tanbris (Andy Bradford))
Stephen King's Desperation (Steve Ames (Steven Weber))
Stop-Loss (SSG Brandon Leonard King (Ryan Phillipe))
Suburbicon (Gardner Lodge (Matt Damon))
Supercross (K.C. Carlyle (Steve Howey))
The Thing (Adam Finch (Eric Christian Olsen))
The Third Wheel (Tee (Greg Pitts))
Three Billboards Outside Ebbing, Missouri (Jason Dixon (Sam Rockwell))
Top Gun (2009 TV Tokyo edition) (LT. Bill "Cougar" Cortell (John Stockwell))
Top Gun: Maverick (Beau "Cyclone" Simpson (Jon Hamm))
Torchwood (Jack Harkness (John Barrowman))
Tracers (Cam (Taylor Lautner))
Trash (José Angelo (Wagner Moura))
Troy (Patroclus (Garrett Hedlund))
U-571 (Seaman Anthony Mazzola (Erik Palladino))
Unbroken (Francis "Mac" McNamara (Finn Wittrock))
The Vampire Diaries (Stefan Salvatore (Paul Wesley))
Velvet Goldmine (Cooper (Joseph Beattie))
The Village (Lucius Hunt (Joaquin Phoenix))
We Own the Night (Robert "Bobby" Green/Grusinsky (Joaquin Phoenix))
Westworld (Caleb Nichols (Aaron Paul))
What We Do in the Shadows (Deacon (Jonathan Brugh))
Zulu (Dan Fletcher (Conrad Kemp))

Animation
Astro Boy (ZOG)
The Batman (Bruce Wayne/Batman)
Batman: The Brave and the Bold (Batman of Zur-En-Arrh)
Gargoyles (Brooklyn)
The Lion King (Kamari)
My Little Pony: Friendship Is Magic (Spear)
The Save-Ums! (Ka-Chung)
Yin Yang Yo! (Flayviour)
Young Justice (Bruce Wayne/Batman)

References

External links
Official agency profile 
 
Yasuyuki Kase at Ryu's Seiyuu Infos

1971 births
Living people
Japanese male video game actors
Japanese male voice actors
Male voice actors from Tokyo
20th-century Japanese male actors
21st-century Japanese male actors